Cowboy Canteen is a 1944 American musical western film directed by Lew Landers and starring Charles Starrett.

Plot
Entertainers perform on a dude ranch for soldiers.

Cast
 Charles Starrett as Steve Bradley
 Jane Frazee as Connie Gray
 Barbara Jo Allen  as Vera Vague (as Vera Vague)
 Tex Ritter as Tex Coulter
 Guinn 'Big Boy' Williams as Spud Harrigan (as Guinn [Big Boy] Williams)
 The Mills Brothers as The Mills Brothers
 Roy Acuff and His Smoky Mountain Boys and Girls as Singing Group
 Jimmy Wakely and His Saddle Pals as Singing Group
 Max Terhune as Professor Merlin 
 Dub Taylor as Cannonball
 Tailor Maids as Singers (as The Tailor Maids)
 Bill Hughes as Bill Hughes
 Buck Chickie and Buck as Whip Act

See also
 List of American films of 1944

References

External links
 

1944 films
1940s English-language films
Films directed by Lew Landers
1940s Western (genre) musical films
American black-and-white films
Columbia Pictures films
Films set on the home front during World War II
American Western (genre) musical films
1940s American films